DCI Cheese Company is a United States food industry company specializing in cheese, headquartered in Richfield, Wisconsin (in Mayville, Wisconsin before 2005). Established in 1975 as Dan Carter, Inc., a consulting firm for cheesemakers, it rapidly grew into a cheese manufacturer and marketer and changed its name to DCI Cheese Company in 2003. 

Acquired by the Fairmount Food Group in 2005, DCI continues to operate as one of the leading specialty cheese companies in the United States. As of 2007 the company is a $500 million business with over 20 unique, company-owned cheese brands.
In 2011, Saputo Inc., a Montreal-based cheese manufacturer with several Wisconsin plants, acquired DCI Cheese Company Inc. of Richfield for $270.5 million.

Brands
Fully owned or exclusively-held brands include:

 Alpenhaus
 Black Diamond
 Black River
 Chevrion
 County Line
 Great Midwest
 Ilchester
 Il Giardino
 Joan of Arc
 King's Choice
 Landana
 Mun-chee
 Nikos
 Organic Creamery
 Prima Donna
 Salemville

In 2004 the company was awarded the Ernst & Young Entrepreneur of the Year award for Wisconsin for its excellence in the Wholesale/Retail Distribution category.

In 2007 the company won Refrigerated & Frozen Food Retailer magazine's Category Colonel Award for Specialty Cheese.

See also
 List of cheesemakers

References

External links
Official website

Dairy products companies of the United States
Cheesemakers
Food and drink companies based in Wisconsin